Benzenedithiol may refer to the following organosulfur compounds:
 1,2-benzenedithiol
 1,3-benzenedithiol
 1,4-benzenedithiol